Tillamook Head is a high promontory on the Pacific coast of northwest Oregon in the United States. It is located in west-central Clatsop County, approximately 5 mi (8 km) southwest of Seaside. The promontory forms a steep rocky bluff on the ocean, approximately 1,200 ft (366 m) high, forested with Sitka spruce. It is located in Ecola State Park.

The promontory is named after the Tillamook, a Salishan-speaking tribe of Native Americans who inhabited the coast south of the promontory in the 19th century. In 1806, Captain William Clark and 12 members of the Corps of Discovery documented their journey south from Fort Clatsop, hiking over the promontory where they encountered a beached whale.

Geology

Tillamook Head is a tilted remnant of a flow of 15-million-year-old Columbia River basalt. The lava welled up near modern-day Idaho, and flooded down the Columbia Gorge. It spread along the Oregon Coast to Tillamook Head, cooling to a 600-foot thick basalt sill.

See also

Nehalem Bank
Tillamook Rock Light
Tillamook Bay
Oregon Coast National Wildlife Refuge Complex
Cape Meares

References

External links
Ecola State Park: Official site

Headlands of Oregon
Lewis and Clark Expedition
Landforms of Clatsop County, Oregon